Xiao Hua may refer to:

 Xiao Hua (Tang dynasty) (8th century), Tang dynasty chancellor
 Xiao Hua (general) (1916–1985), PLA general